Eleutherodactylus glandulifer (common names: La Hotte glanded frog, Doris' robber frog) is a species of frog in the family Eleutherodactylidae endemic to the Massif de la Hotte, Haiti. Its natural habitat is closed-canopy forest, usually near streams. Its most distinctive feature are its striking blue sapphire-colored eyes—a highly unusual trait among amphibians.

It is threatened by habitat loss; while the species occurs in the Pic Macaya National Park, there is no active management for conservation, and the habitat loss continues in the park.

References

glandulifer
Frogs of Haiti
Endemic fauna of Haiti
Amphibians described in 1935
Taxa named by Doris Mable Cochran
Taxonomy articles created by Polbot